Adventuress Wanted  is a documentary film starring Thomas McAlevey and Yoshiko Kino. It is written and directed by McAlevey.

Synopsis
On a quest for the perfect partner, an American man chooses a Japanese woman to attempt a 30,000-mile adventure across Africa, in a beach buggy.

The film opens in Stockholm, following the life of McAlevey, who decides to recruit a female companion for the adventure. The journey begins during a blizzard – forcing the pair to drive, roofless, through a freezing Europe and over snow-covered Alps. In the Sahara desert, the buggy literally falls to pieces, paralleling the growing tribulations of Yoshiko and McAlevey’s relationship. McAlevey falls sick in Cairo and has emergency surgery. While recovering, he and Yoshiko argue and decide to give up the trip.

The Swedish press closely followed their trip to its conclusion, including the Swedish tabloid  Aftonbladet, one of the larger daily newspapers in the Nordic countries, and others.

Release
The film was originally screened for the public in April 2010 at the New York International Independent Film and Video Festival on July 29, 2010 in New York City. It was also screened at the Downtown Film Festival in Los Angeles in September, 2010.

Awards
New York International Independent Film and Video Festival 2010 - Best Directorial Debut (Feature Documentary) to Thomas McAlevey

References

External links
 
 

2009 films
2000s English-language films
2009 documentary films
Swedish independent films
Swedish documentary films
2009 independent films
2000s Swedish films